Oswaldkirk is a small village and civil parish  south of Helmsley and  north of York in the Ryedale district of North Yorkshire, England.  It is named after the village church of St Oswald, King and Martyr, the Anglo-Saxon King of Northumbria who was slain by the pagan, Penda in 642.  There was previously a Catholic church, dedicated to St Aidan, which closed in 2020. The population of the village as taken at the 2011 census was 230.

The village is situated at the junction of the roads B1257 and B1363 and straddles the boundaries of the North York Moors National Park and the Howardian Hills Area of Outstanding Natural Beauty. Non-ecclesiastical amenities include a playground, a village hall and a pub called "The Malt Shovel". The Millennium Trail, a  circular waymarked walk around Oswaldkirk, takes in the major historical sites and points of interest. The village is also on the path of the Ebor Way.

Each year the village holds a Safari Lunch, a Cricket match and a Bonfire. Every two years there is a benefice Hog Roast (Ampleforth, Gilling East, Stonegrave & Oswaldkirk). In 2002 the village community wrote a book entitled Oswaldkirk: A Living Village. In 2008, the village reached the North of England Finals in the Calor village of the year competition, and was placed first in the "people" category.

Geology
Oswaldkirk is situated to the south of a steep hill, known as "Oswaldkirk Hagg". Many springs rise along the base of the hill, at the boundary of the Kimmeridge Clay and the Corallian Oolite. The latter was mined into the twentieth century in numerous quarries on the hagg between Oswaldkirk and Ampleforth, and fossils from the limestone, especially gastropods, are often found in the village.

History
The first recorded reference to Oswaldkirk was in the Domesday Book (1086). It was referred to as "Oswaldecherca"  or "Oswaldecherce" (Oswald's Church).

Oswaldkirk Hall, a Grade II* listed building, was built  for William Moor and is one of eight listed buildings or structures in the parish.

References

External links

Villages in North Yorkshire
Civil parishes in North Yorkshire